The Beriev A-100 is a Russian-built airborne early warning and control (AEW&C) aircraft based on the Il-76MD-90A transport aircraft. This aircraft is developed to replace the Beriev A-50 in Russian Air Force service. Avionics and configuration will be similar to the A-50U, but with a new Vega Premier Active Phased Array Radar.

Design and development

The A-100 is also known as the Izdeliye PM, and is planned to reinforce and then replace Russia's current fleet of Beriev A-50 AEW&C aircraft. Its development contract was signed in 2006 with the Vega Radio Engineering Corporation. The aircraft is based on the improved Il-76MD-90A (Il-476), which is equipped with new PS-90A-76 turbofan engines that are 15% more powerful than the D-30KP used by the Il-76. The external shape of the A-100 will be similar to the A-50, with the main radar array housed in a rotating dome mounted on two struts above the fuselage. The new Vega Premier AESA radar in the dome will have electronic steering in elevation while azimuth is controlled by the rotation of the dome. The array will rotate once every 5 seconds, thus improving the radar's ability to track fast moving targets. In addition to the new radar, the A-100 will have a new electronic warfare suite, a new navigation system, and new communication systems, including a satellite communication antenna.

A flying laboratory, designated A-100LL and based on an A-50 airframe, is used to test the operation of the A-100's systems and help with their conception. It first flew on 21 April 2017.

In April 2020, it was said by a source in the Russian military industry that Russia's Aerospace Forces will begin taking delivery of the new Beriev A-100 in 2024, to complement and eventually replace the existing Beriev A-50 and A-50U AEW planes in the Aerospace Forces’ inventory today.

In February 2022 The Drive reported that sanctions placed on Russia had delayed the project.

Specifications (Il-476)

See also

References

External links
 Global Security page on the A-100

AWACS aircraft
A-100
Quadjets
High-wing aircraft
T-tail aircraft
Aircraft first flown in 2017